St. Michael's Catholic Academy is a private college preparatory high school in Barton Creek, a community in unincorporated Travis County, Texas (Greater Austin), with an enrollment of approximately 360 students in grades 9-12. It is within the Roman Catholic Diocese of Austin. 

St. Michael's requires the student to have at least 26 hours before graduating, including one year of a fine arts and one year of athletic credits. St. Michael's students gain admission to colleges such as the United States Military Academy, Princeton University, Stanford University, Vanderbilt University, Texas A&M University,  University of Texas, Southern Methodist University, Reed College, University of Notre Dame, Emory University, Washington University in St. Louis, and Rice University, and is considered one of the most reputable academic institutions in the Austin area. The student to teacher to ratio is approximately 8 to 1, and the mean ACT Composite is 26.6. In 2015 and 2016, St. Michael's won the Class 4A Henderson Cup, awarded by the Texas Association of Private and Parochial Schools (TAPPS) for excellence in Academics, Fine Arts, and Athletics. In 2016, St. Michael's won four state championships: Academics, Women's Tennis, Women's Cross Country, and Men's Track & Field. In athletics, St. Michael's has achieved unparalleled success, with more than 30 state championships in 34 years of existence. Many former St. Michael's student-athletes have played, or are now playing, Division 1 sports at the college level including football, baseball, basketball, track and field, golf, volleyball, cross country, baseball, and soccer.

Background
St. Michael's Catholic Academy was established in 1984 to fill the void left by the closing of the only Catholic high school in Austin in 1972. From 1972 to 1984, Austin was the only sizable city in the country without a Catholic high school. A small group of parents and Catholic lay leaders commissioned a study that ultimately revealed enthusiasm in the Austin community for such a school. In 1984, St. Michael's Catholic Academy opened its doors. It was one of the first Catholic schools in the nation established entirely by lay persons.

Notable alumni
 Jameson Houston, NFL player
 Kyle Martin, 2009, pitcher for the Boston Red Sox
 Mitch Morse, 2010, offensive lineman at the University of Missouri; selected in 2015 NFL Draft by the Kansas City Chiefs
 Cameron Hardy, singer-songwriter

Notes and references

Catholic secondary schools in Texas
Educational institutions established in 1984
High schools in Travis County, Texas
1984 establishments in Texas